Night Shift (French: Service de nuit) is a 1932 French comedy film directed by Henri Fescourt and starring Marcel Barencey, Gaston Dupray and Paulette Dubost. It is based on the 1913 German play Tired Theodore by Max Ferner and Max Neal which has been adapted for the screen a number of times. A separate Swedish-language version Tired Theodore was also produced.

Cast
 Marcel Barencey as Théodore Beudraves 
 Mylo d'Arcylle as 	Rose Beudraves
 Paulette Duvernet as 	Gaby Beauchamp
 Robert Darthez as 	Darius Beudraves
 Gaston Dupray as 	Camille Ducreux
 Paulette Dubost as 	La petite femme
 Anna Lefeuvrier as 	Sarah
 Fred Marche as Isaac
 Louis Florencie as 	Le commissaire
 Henri Jullien as Le professeur de chant
 Ketty Pierson as 	Marie
 André Numès Fils as Laplotte
 Robert Trèves as 	Le président

References

Bibliography 
 Goble, Alan. The Complete Index to Literary Sources in Film. Walter de Gruyter, 1999.

External links 
 

1932 comedy films
French comedy films
1932 films
1930s French-language films
Films directed by Henri Fescourt
French films based on plays
1930s French films